David Phillip Roe (born July 21, 1945) is an American politician and physician who was the U.S. representative for , serving from 2009 to 2021. He is a member of the Republican Party. From 2017 to 2019, Roe was chairman of the House Committee on Veterans Affairs.

Roe announced in January 2020 that he would not run for re-election in 2020.

Early life, education, and career 
Roe was born on July 21, 1945 in Clarksville, Tennessee. He graduated from Austin Peay State University in 1967 and earned his Medical Degree from the University of Tennessee College of Medicine in 1972.

After graduating from medical school, Roe served in the United States Army Medical Corps, attached to the 2nd Infantry Division at Camp Casey, South Korea. He was discharged as a major in 1974. He then went into OB/GYN practice in Johnson City, retiring after 31 years, including his work as a physician at State of Franklin Healthcare Associates (SOFHA). SOFHA was founded in 1997. Roe delivered close to 5,000 babies throughout those 31 years.

After first being elected into the U.S. House of Representatives, Roe purchased a 1.8% ownership share of State of Franklin Healthcare Associates Real Estate Partners with property holdings within the Med-Tech Regional Business Park located in the northern section of Johnson City.

Political career 
Roe was first elected to the Johnson City Commission in 2003, serving as vice mayor of Johnson City from 2003–2007 and then as mayor from 2007 to 2009.

Roe served as head of the congressional committee on the Veterans Association.

He ran on setting term limits of congressman to two terms. Roe served six terms.

In January 2020, before news of the pandemic was available except to Congress, Roe’s personal financial team dropped all stocks in Carnival Cruise Corp and bought other stock that made over $20 million.

Soon after, Roe announced his intention not to seek a seventh term.

U.S. House of Representatives

Elections
2008

Roe defeated incumbent congressman David Davis in the 2008 primary by 500 votes. Davis blamed his loss on votes from Democrats who crossed over to vote for Roe in the open primary. Roe had previously run for the seat in 2006 when 10-year incumbent Bill Jenkins announced his retirement, but lost to Davis in that year's primary.

Roe defeated Democratic nominee Rob Russell, director of the Writing and Communication Center at East Tennessee State University, in the November general election with 72 percent of the vote. However, it was widely presumed that Roe had clinched a seat in Congress with his victory in the primary. The 1st, anchored in the Tri-Cities region, is one of the few ancestrally Republican districts in the South; the GOP has held it continuously since 1881, and for all but four years since 1859.

Shortly after his successful bid to represent the 1st District, Roe was interviewed by "Believe It, Achieve It," a DC-based radio program aimed at promoting youth interest in politics. The interview featured Roe conversing with a robot on topics ranging from health and fitness to the death of Michael Jackson.

2010

Roe won re-election in 2010 with 80.8% of the vote against Democratic nominee Michael Clark.

Tenure
The 1st is known for giving its congressmen very long tenures in Washington; Roe was only the eighth person to hold the seat in 88 years.

Roe hired Andrew Duke, a former chief of staff for North Carolina Republican congressman Robin Hayes, as his chief of staff. According to National Journal’s 2009 Vote Ratings, he was ranked as the 101st conservative in the House.

On February 5, 2013, Roe introduced the National Desert Storm and Desert Shield War Memorial Act (H.R. 503; 113th Congress) into the House. The bill would authorize the National Desert Storm Memorial Association to establish a memorial to honor members of the armed forces who participated in Operation Desert Storm or Operation Desert Shield. Roe said "I believe we should honor the commitment of every man and woman that honorably serves this country, and I am proud to see this bill move forward."

During June 2013, WJHL-TV in Johnson City reported that Roe had written a letter to the federal court in Greeneville on the behalf of Dr. William Kincaid, who had pleaded guilty to one count of receiving in interstate commerce a misbranded drug. Federal prosecutors under the Independent Payment Advisory Board argued that Dr. Kincaid's driving forces for breaking the law were "money and greed" and because that decision by Kincaid created a "substantial risk of harm to patients," prosecutors also said Kincaid should spend the maximum three years behind bars for fraudulently obtaining federal reimbursement as a healthcare provider.

Roe had initially promised to serve only five terms (10 years) in Congress. However, on February 6, 2018; he announced he would run for a sixth term, saying that he needed to continue the work begun when he became chairman of the House Veterans Affairs Committee.

Committee assignments
 Committee on Veterans' Affairs (Ranking member)
 Committee on Education and the Workforce
 Subcommittee on Early Childhood, Elementary and Secondary Education
 Subcommittee on Health, Employment, Labor, and Pensions

Caucus memberships
United States Congressional International Conservation Caucus
 Physician's Caucus
 Republican Study Committee
 Sportsmen's Caucus
 Tea Party Caucus
 Congressional Arts Caucus
Academic Medicine Caucus

Personal life 
Roe resides in Jonesborough with his wife Clarinda, who is the sister of Congressman Mike Kelly’s wife.

See also
 Physicians in US Congress

References

External links

 
 
 

|-

|-

|-

|-

|-

1945 births
21st-century American politicians
American gynecologists
American obstetricians
Methodists from Tennessee
Austin Peay State University alumni
Christians from Tennessee
Living people
Mayors of places in Tennessee
Military personnel from Tennessee
People from Johnson City, Tennessee
Republican Party members of the United States House of Representatives from Tennessee
Tea Party movement activists
United States Army Medical Corps officers
University of Tennessee Health Science Center alumni